UTL may refer to:

Technical University of Lisbon
An acronym for "unable to locate", commonly used in North American police reports in conjunction with "GOA" ("gone on arrival") when someone mentioned by a caller cannot be found when officers reach the scene.
University of Toronto Libraries
Union Territory of Lakshadweep
Université du Temps Libre, French for "University of Free Time", educational and cultural activities offered by various universities in France and French-speaking Belgium
Uganda Telecom Limited

See also 
 ULT (disambiguation)